Mühlhausen im Täle is a municipality of the district of Göppingen in Baden-Württemberg, Germany.

History
Mühlhausen im Täle was first mentioned in 812. In the 12th century, it became a possession of the County of Helfenstein, who ruled the area until it was mediatized to the Kingdom of Württemberg in 1806. In 1938, the town was assigned to the district of Göppingen. Mühlhausen grew extensively after World War II. Its municipal name was changed from Mühlhausen to Mühlhausen im Täle in 1959.

Geography
The municipality (Gemeinde) of Mühlhausen im Täle is found in the south of the district of Göppingen, in the German state of Baden-Württemberg. Elevation above sea level in the municipal area ranges from a high of  Normalnull (NN) to a low of  NN.

Portions of the Federally-protected  and Sterneck nature reserves are located in Mühlhausen's municipal area.

Politics
The municipality of Mühlhausen im Täle includes the villages of Eselhöfe, Exenmühle, and Todsburg. Along with the municipalities of Wiesensteig, Drackenstein, Gruibingen, and Hohenstadt, Mühlhausen has since 1972 been a member of the Upper Fils Valley . Mühlhausen is also a member of the local school association and sewage association.

Coat of arms
Mühlhausen's coat of arms displays a cuckoo bird in white upon a field of red. The cuckoo bird is a reference to a local nickname for Mühlhausen's inhabitants and the tincture is taken from the arms of the House of Rechberg. This pattern was first adopted by the municipal council in 1930 and was approved for official use and a corresponding municipal flag issued by the Federal Ministry of the Interior on 19 February 1959.

Transportation
Mühlhausen is connected to Germany's network of roadways by Bundesautobahn 8 and Bundesstraße 466. From 1903 to 1968, it was connected to Germany's railway system by the Tälesbahn railroad.

References

External links

  (in German)

Towns in Baden-Württemberg
Göppingen (district)